John Webb (born 1969) is an English composer.

Biography
He was educated in Essex where he started playing the piano and viola. He began to compose at 14, and two years later attended Colchester Institute. Here he studied piano with Frank Wibaut and composition with John Joubert at the Birmingham Conservatoire.

As a founding member of the Thallein Ensemble, he performed works by Berio, Messiaen, Finnissy, Ives and Schnittke. In his final year he completed a dissertation on Schnittke's polystylism and was the soloist in his piano concerto.

After graduating from Birmingham Conservatoire with a first class degree, he studied for three years at the Royal Academy of Music with Christopher Brown. In his last year he was Leverhulme Composition Fellow and won the major composition prizes; he graduated with MMus and DipRAM.

He went on to develop contacts with period instrument performers and has written works for 'old' instruments which have recently been revived, including viols, harpsichord (commissions by Gary Cooper and Trevor Pinnock), and baroque orchestra.

He lectures at Birmingham Conservatoire and runs education projects for English National Opera, The Stables, Milton Keynes and the Wigmore Hall. He taught composition and general studies at the Junior Department of the Royal Academy of Music until leaving at the end of the 2005-2006 academic year. He has since returned to cover David Knotts' timetable whilst his colleague was in America.

Selected works

Orchestral works
Concerto for classical accordion, strings and clarinet (1997) 20 mins
White Stones (1995-6) 8 mins; orchestra
Barcarolle (1993-4) 9 mins; orchestra
A Caribbean Dawn and Celebration (1993) 12 mins; orchestra and steel band
The Tin-Pot Foreign General and the Old Iron Woman (1990) 13 mins; orchestra and narrator. From the book by Raymond Briggs

Choral works
Into His Marvellous Light (1997) 5 mins; choir, solo viola and organ

Chamber works
Cries of London (1994) 25 mins; string quartet
Prelude, Waltz and Tambourin (1994-5) 7 mins; 4 violins
Four Bagatelles (1994) 14 mins; free bass accordion, two violins, cello
On Christmas Night... (1994) 9 mins; 3 baroque oboes, 3 oboes da caccia, 2 baroque bassoons, 1 baroque contra-bassoon, harpsichord, percussion
Masque (1995) 5 mins; treble viol, two tenor viols, bass viol
Calm (1992) 9 mins; flute, oboe, clarinet (or viola), violin, cello
PUMP (1992) 7 mins; 4 bassoons
Sextet for Piano and Wind
Prelude and Chaconne; baroque orchestra

Instrumental works
Sans Noir (1995) 9 mins; piano; also versions for harpsichord and wind quintet
Here's Fine Rosemary, Sage and Thyme... (1994) 3 mins; viola
Pastorale (1993) 5 mins; organ
Five Atmospheres (1989–91) 9 mins; piano
Chromatic Rhapsody (1987) 5 mins; two pianos 
Hop-bodee-boody's Last Will and Testament for soprano, 4 violas and harpsichord (1998)

Vocal works
 Love Songs (1992) 15 mins; tenor and guitar. Texts by Roger McGough and Tony Harrison

References
 Profile on BMIC website (citing above quote by the composer)
 Profile on Sound and Music website

External links
 Composer's website
 profile on Composers.co.uk
 Goals as cited above in their probable original context
 Biography on Tête à Tête website

English classical composers
Living people
20th-century classical composers
21st-century classical composers
1969 births
Alumni of Birmingham Conservatoire
English male classical composers
20th-century English composers
20th-century British male musicians
21st-century British male musicians